Jan Appelmans (1352–1411) was the first architect of the Cathedral of Our Lady, Antwerp, succeeded by his son Pieter Appelmans.

External links 
 Architecture in Belgium

Burgundian Netherlands architects
1352 births
1411 deaths